Tevita Tu'amoeloa Fetaiakimoeata Fifita (born May 7, 1983) is an American professional wrestler, currently working for New Japan Pro-Wrestling (NJPW), under the ring name Tanga Loa (タンガ・ロア　Tanga Roa) (originally Tanga Roa).

Fifita started his wrestling career in WWE's farm territory Florida Championship Wrestling in 2009. He was promoted to the main roster in 2011, where he worked as Camacho in a tag team with Hunico. They worked on the undercard on SmackDown and NXT for a few years. After he left WWE in 2014, he worked for two years in Total Nonstop Action Wrestling (TNA) under the name Micah, where he won the 2015's Gut Check. Later, he left the promotion and joined NJPW as Tanga Loa, joining his brother Tama Tonga as Guerrillas of Destiny, a subgroup of the heel faction Bullet Club. In NJPW, he and Tonga are seven-time IWGP Tag Team Champions and former three-time NEVER Openweight 6-Man Tag Team Champions with Bad Luck Fale and Taiji Ishimori.  He also has made appearances in the U.S. based promotion Ring of Honor (ROH), where the Guerrillas of Destiny are former one-time ROH World Tag Team Champions.

Fifita is part of a large wrestling family, as he is the brother of Tama Tonga and Hikuleo and the son of Haku.

Early years 
Born in Honolulu, Hawaii, Fifita attended the University of Texas at El Paso, where he played football as a defensive end. Fifita graduated with a degree in liberal arts with major in Communications Electronic Media and minor in criminal justice.

Professional wrestling career

World Wrestling Entertainment/WWE (2009–2014) 
After taking part in a World Wrestling Entertainment (WWE) tryout alongside his adoptive brother Alipate, Fifita signed a developmental contract with the promotion on February 10, 2009, and was assigned to its developmental territory Florida Championship Wrestling (FCW) as Tonga. In March, he became known as Agent T, as part of Abraham Washington's Secret Service stable, alongside Agent D and Agent J. He later changed his name to Donny Marlow. On July 21, 2011, Marlow and CJ Parker defeated Calvin Raines and Big E Langston to win the FCW Florida Tag Team Championship. On November 3, Marlow and Parker lost the Tag Team Championship to Brad Maddox and Briley Pierce.

On the December 15, 2011 episode of Superstars, Fifita came to the ring as the new enforcer of Hunico, and his new ring name was revealed as Camacho. Hunico and Camacho first teamed together on the April 26 episode of Superstars where they beat the Usos. Camacho made his pay-per-view debut at Over the Limit, where he was defeated by Ryback in a singles match. Camacho began appearing again on WWE's developmental territory, the former FCW, which had been rebranded into NXT Wrestling; He made his NXT debut on the July 4, 2012 episode of the rebooted NXT, first losing to Seth Rollins but emerging victorious later that episode in a six-man tag match while teaming with Hunico and Michael McGillicutty against Rollins, Bo Dallas, and Tyson Kidd. On the next episode of NXT, Camacho defeated Kidd in a singles match following a distraction from McGillicutty. In the pre-show of Money in the Bank, he and Hunico lost to the  WWE Tag Team Champions, Kofi Kingston and R-Truth in a non-title match. At Raw 1,000, Camacho, along with Hunico and four other wrestlers attempted to ambush Kane to make a statement, but The Undertaker's return resulted in the Brothers of Destruction disposing of all six would-be attackers. With Hunico out injured, Camacho continued to compete on NXT; after a $5,000 bounty was promised to anyone who could put Big E Langston "on the shelf"; Camacho attempted to claim the bounty in late-2012 so that he could "get Hunico out of Mexico", but he was squashed by Langston. On April 4, 2013, Camacho reunited with Hunico at the WrestleMania Axxess live event. On the November 6, 2013 episode of Main Event he and Hunico made their first televised tag team match since July 2012, losing to The Usos.  He and Hunico then started a feud against The Ascension, defeating them in a non-title match, but were then defeated in a NXT championship match.

Once Hunico started portraying Sin Cara again, Camacho started to wrestle solo on NXT. Camacho scored a rare victory over the returning Oliver Grey at the March 13 television tapings. His last feud in WWE was with Adam Rose on NXT, which began when he attacked one of Rose's followers after a match and ended at NXT TakeOver when Camacho lost to Rose. On June 12, 2014, Camacho was released from his contract.

Total Nonstop Action Wrestling (2015–2016) 

On February 16, 2015, Fifita participated at Total Nonstop Action Wrestling's  TNA One Night Only's Gut Check, where he won a tournament to earn a spot in the company. On March 15, 2015, Fifita, under the ring name of Micah and announcing himself as the son of Haku, made his debut at Impact Wrestling as a member of The Rising, a stable consisting of himself, Drew Galloway, and Eli Drake. On the April 24 edition of Impact Wrestling, Micah defeated Kenny King. On the May 22 episode of Impact Wrestling, Micah wrestled against Kenny King for his TNA X Division Championship, but failed to win the title. On the June 3 episode of Impact Wrestling, The Rising defeated The Beat Down Clan. On the July 1 edition of Impact Wrestling, The Beat Down Clan defeated The Rising in a 4-on-3 handicap match, forcing The Rising to dissolve. On the September 9 edition of Impact Wrestling, Micah, Tigre Uno and Robbie E defeated Jessie Godderz, Kenny King and his former partner Eli Drake in a six man tag team match. From October to November (during which Impact Wrestling had been taped from July 22-July 25), Micah participated in the TNA World Title Series in the "Future 4" group, during which he earned 4 points and thus failed to qualify for the successive round of 16. On the December 16 edition of Impact Wrestling, Micah wrestled his final match for TNA, where he teamed up with Eli Drake, Jessie Godderz and Crimson in a losing effort against Tigre Uno, DJ Z, Manik and Mandrews in an Eight-Man Tag Team match. Micah did not appear after this leading to his release.

New Japan Pro-Wrestling (2016–present) 

On March 12, 2016, Fifita was announced as the newest member of New Japan Pro-Wrestling (NJPW) stable Bullet Club. The announcement was made by his brother Tama Tonga, who challenged Togi Makabe and Tomoaki Honma to a match for the IWGP Tag Team Championship at Invasion Attack 2016. Two days later, Fifita was given the new ring name Tanga Loa (sometimes spelled "Tanga Roa"), while his team with his brother was dubbed Guerrillas of Destiny (G.O.D). Fifita's ring name was taken from Tangaloa, a family of gods in Tongan mythology. Loa made his NJPW debut on March 27 by attacking Togi Makabe during his match with Tonga, causing a disqualification. Loa's debut match took place on April 1, when he and Bullet Club stablemates Tonga, Bad Luck Fale, Kenny Omega and Yujiro Takahashi were defeated by Makabe, Honma, Juice Robinson, Hiroshi Tanahashi and Michael Elgin in a ten-man elimination tag team match. On April 10 at Invasion Attack 2016, G.O.D defeated Makabe and Honma to become the new IWGP Tag Team Champions. They lost the title to The Briscoe Brothers (Jay and Mark) on June 19 at Dominion 6.19 in Osaka-jo Hall. On October 10 at King of Pro-Wrestling, the Guerrillas of Destiny regained the IWGP Tag Team Championship from the Briscoe Brothers. In December, the Guerrillas of Destiny won their block in the 2016 World Tag League with a record of six wins and one loss and advanced to the finals of the tournament. On December 10, the Guerrillas of Destiny were defeated in the finals of the tournament by Togi Makabe and Tomoaki Honma. On January 4, 2017, Loa and Tonga lost the IWGP Tag Team Championship to Tomohiro Ishii and Toru Yano in a three-way match, also involving Makabe and Honma. On June 11 at Dominion 6.11 in Osaka-jo Hall, Loa and Tonga defeated War Machine (Hanson and Raymond Rowe) to win the IWGP Tag Team Championship for the third time. They lost the title back to War Machine in a no disqualification match on July 1 at G1 Special in USA. In December, Guerrillas of Destiny won their block in the 2017 World Tag League with a record of five wins and two losses, advancing to the finals of the tournament. On December 11, they were defeated in the finals of the tournament by Los Ingobernables de Japón (Evil and Sanada). Six days later, Guerrillas of Destiny and Bad Luck Fale defeated Evil, Sanada and Bushi to become the new NEVER Openweight 6-Man Tag Team Champions. They lost the title to Chaos (Beretta, Tomohiro Ishii and Toru Yano) in a five-team gauntlet match on January 4, 2018, at Wrestle Kingdom 12 in Tokyo Dome. The following day at New Year's Dash, they would regain the title from Chaos.

At The New Beginning in Sapporo, Bullet Club stablemate Cody turned on the leader of the stable, Kenny Omega. This led to there being two sides to Bullet Club; Team Cody and Team Kenny. While Tama and Loa stayed neutral at Strong Style Evolved before a tag team match against Marty Scurll and Cody, Loa speaking for both himself and his brother, stated if they were to be on a team it wouldn't be Team Cody. On the first night of the Wrestling Dontaku 2018 shows, G.O.D and Fale lost the NEVER Openweight 6-Man Tag Team Championship to the Super Villains (Marty Scurll and the Young Bucks). The second night, Tama debuted the newest member to Bullet Club, Taiji Ishimori. Later, it was announced that Tama will be competing in the G1 Climax 28.

At the G1 Special in San Francisco, Tama, Loa, King Haku, Chase Owens, and Yujiro Takahashi defeated CHAOS members Gedo, Yoshi-Hashi, and Roppongi 3K (Rocky Romero, Sho and Yoh), with Tama pinning Gedo after a Tongan Death Grip by Haku to Gedo followed by a Gun Stun. At the end of the night, following Kenny's victory over Cody in the main event, Tama, Loa, and Haku came out to seemingly celebrate with Kenny and the Young Bucks in a show of loyalty, only to attack The Elite, as well as fellow Bullet Club members Hangman Page, Marty Scurll, even Chase and Takahashi, and finally Cody, when they tried to intervene. They then left the ring declaring that they were the true Bullet Club.

On January 30, 2019, they lost the NEVER Openweight 6-Man Championship against Ryusuke Taguchi, Makabe and Yano.

On February 23, 2019, they would regain the IWGP Heavyweight Tag Team Titles by defeating Sanada & Evil at Honor Rising 2019: Day 2, starting their fifth reign. After defending the championships seven times, their reign would end when G.O.D lost to FinJuice (Juice Robinson & David Finlay) at Wrestle Kingdom 14. They would soon immediately regain the belts at The New Beginning in the USA event in Atlanta, before again losing them without a defence to Golden*Ace (Hiroshi Tanahashi & Kota Ibushi) on a New Japan Road show in Korakuen Hall.

After the 2020 Pandemic, Guerrillas of Destiny would make their return to Japan as participants of the World Tag League. They would win the tournament for the first time after defeating FinJuice in the finals. They would go on to win an IWGP Tag Team Title match at the Tokyo Dome for the first time, defeating champions Dangerous Tekkers (Taichi & Zack Sabre Jr.) after Loa hit 'ApeSh*t' (a Sitout Reverse Piledriver) on Taichi after 19 minutes & 18 seconds. They lost the championships back to the Dangerous Tekkers on June 1.

Consejo Mundial de Lucha Libre (2016) 
On June 1, 2016, the Mexican Consejo Mundial de Lucha Libre (CMLL) promotion announced Roa and Tonga as participants in the 2016 International Gran Prix. On June 24, Roa, Tonga and Sam Adonis defeated Atlantis, Diamante Azul and Volador Jr. in Arena México. On July 1, Roa took part in the 2016 International Gran Prix, from which he was eliminated by Último Guerrero.

Personal life 
Fifita is a second generation professional wrestler; his father Tonga was the professional wrestler better known as Meng or Haku. He has a biological sister, Vika. His adopted brothers Alipate and Taula are also wrestlers; currently all three brothers, as well as cousin Simi Taitoko Fale, wrestle together in New Japan Pro-Wrestling as part of the Bullet Club stable. The Anoa'i family such as The Usos, The Rock and Roman Reigns are considered family to the Tongans despite no blood relation after Peter Maivia helped train his father Haku and the close bond the family shares with one another.

Championships and accomplishments 

 Florida Championship Wrestling
 FCW Florida Tag Team Championship (1 time) – with CJ Parker
 New Japan Pro-Wrestling
 IWGP Tag Team Championship (7 times) – with Tama Tonga
 NEVER Openweight 6-Man Tag Team Championship (3 times) – with Bad Luck Fale and Tama Tonga (2), and Taiji Ishimori and Tama Tonga (1)
 World Tag League (2020) – with Tama Tonga
 Pro Wrestling Illustrated
 Ranked No. 97 of the top 500 singles wrestlers in the PWI 500 in 2019
 Ranked No. 6 of the top 50 tag teams in the PWI Tag Team 50 in 2020 
 Ring of Honor
 ROH World Tag Team Championship (1 time) – with Tama Tonga
 Total Nonstop Action Wrestling
 TNA Gut Check (2015)
 WrestleCircus
 WC Big Top Tag Team Championship (1 time) – with Tama Tonga

References

External links 

1983 births
American male professional wrestlers
American people of Tongan descent
Expatriate professional wrestlers in Japan
Tongan male professional wrestlers
Professional wrestling managers and valets
Living people
People from Kissimmee, Florida
UTEP Miners football players
Bullet Club members
TNA Gut Check contestants
21st-century professional wrestlers
ROH World Tag Team Champions
NEVER Openweight 6-Man Tag Team Champions
IWGP Heavyweight Tag Team Champions
FCW Florida Tag Team Champions